Acacia robeorum, commonly known as Robe's wattle, is a shrub of the genus Acacia and the subgenus Phyllodineae that is endemic to north western Australia.

Description
The main stems are usually slightly crooked and support an open croen with smooth grey coloured bark on the main stems that becomes a light bronze colour on the on upper branches. The terete and glabrous branchlets have yellowish to bronze coloured but obscure ribbing and spint stipules with a length of  that are found less as the plants ages. Like most species of Acacia, it has phyllodes rather than true leaves.

Distribution
It is native to an area in the Kimberley and Pilbara regions of Western Australia. The range of the shrub extends from around Marble Bar and Pardoo Station in the north of the Pilbara down to around Ethel Creek Station in the south and out to Rudall River National Park in the Little Sandy Desert where it is often situated along drainage lines growing in sandy loam or skeletal sandy soils over laterite, granite or quartz bedrock as a part of spinifex grassland communities.

See also
 List of Acacia species

References

robeorum
Acacias of Western Australia
Taxa named by Bruce Maslin
Plants described in 2008